Yanaqucha (Quechua yana black, very dark, qucha lake, "black lake", Hispanicized spelling Yanacocha) is a lake in the Andes of  Peru located in the Huánuco Region, Huamalíes Province, Llata District. It is situated southeast of the lake Saqraqucha, at the foot of the mountain Warmi Wañusqa (Huarmihuañusqa).

References 

Lakes of Peru
Lakes of Huánuco Region